Chen Yiwen (born 15 June 1999) is a Chinese diver.

Early life
Born on 1999, Chen's father was from Hainan, while her mother was from Zhanjiang, Guangdong. When she was almost nine years old, she went to Guangdong for training and entered sports school in Chikan District of Zhanjiang to begin training for her diving career. In August 2008, she officially entered the Zhongshan diving team. Soon after entering the Zhongshan team, Chen was selected into the Guangdong Provincial Sports School. In October 2010, Chen entered the Guangdong diving team and in 2014, she officially became a professional athlete.

Sports career
In November 2016, Chen was selected into the national diving team. On May 17, 2017, she won the women's 1m springboard diving at the 2017 China Diving Championship. In June 2018, she won the men's and women's mixed all-around diving at the 2018 FINA Diving World Cup in Wuhan. On July 13, 2019, she won the gold medal at the women's 1m springboard championship at 2019 World Aquatics Championships in Gwangju. In May 2021, at the 2021 FINA Diving World Cup in Tokyo, she and Chang Yani won the women's double 3m diving, and she also won women's 3m springboard diving. In August 2021, Chen won gold medal in women's 3m springboard diving at the 14th National Games of China in Shaanxi.

At the 19th FINA World Championships 2022 held in Budapest, Chen took part in the women's 3m springboard and won the gold medal with 366.90 points. She also won the gold medal at the women's synchronized 3m springboard alongside Chang Yani with 343.14 points.

References

External links
FINA Profile

1999 births
Living people
Chinese female divers
World Aquatics Championships medalists in diving
Asian Games medalists in diving
Divers at the 2018 Asian Games
Asian Games silver medalists for China
Medalists at the 2018 Asian Games
People from Haikou
Sportspeople from Hainan
21st-century Chinese women